The year 2009 is the 2nd year in the history of World Victory Road, a mixed martial arts promotion based in Japan. In 2009 World Victory Road held 9 events beginning with, World Victory Road Presents: Sengoku Rebellion 2009.

Title fights

Events list

World Victory Road Presents: Sengoku no Ran 2009

World Victory Road Presents: Sengoku no Ran 2009 was an event held on January 4, 2009 at the Saitama Super Arena in Saitama City, Japan.

Results

World Victory Road Presents: Gold Rush Korea

World Victory Road Presents: Gold Rush Korea was an event held on March 11, 2009 at the team Maru Training Center in Seoul, South Korea.

Results

World Victory Road Presents: Sengoku 7

World Victory Road Presents: Sengoku 7 was an event held on March 20, 2009 at the Yoyogi National Gymnasium in Tokyo, Japan.

Results

World Victory Road Presents: Sengoku 8

World Victory Road Presents: Sengoku 8 was an event held on May 2, 2009 at the Yoyogi National Gymnasium in Tokyo, Japan.

Results

World Victory Road Presents: Sengoku Gold Cup Semi-finals

World Victory Road Presents: Sengoku Gold Cup Semi-finals was an event held on June 16, 2009 at PS Lab in Yokohama, Japan.

Results

World Victory Road Presents: Sengoku 9

World Victory Road Presents: Sengoku 9 was an event held on September 2, 2009 at the Saitama Super Arena in Saitama City, Japan.

Results

World Victory Road Presents: Sengoku 10

World Victory Road Presents: Sengoku 10 was an event held on September 23, 2009 at the Saitama Super Arena in Saitama City, Japan.

Results

World Victory Road Presents: Sengoku 11

World Victory Road Presents: Sengoku 11 was an event held on November 7, 2009 at Ryogoku Kokugikan in Tokyo, Japan.

Results

Dynamite!! The Power of Courage 2009

Dynamite!! The Power of Courage 2009 was a mixed martial arts and kickboxing event promoted by Fighting and Entertainment Group, was an event held on December 31, 2009 at the Saitama Super Arena in Saitama, Japan. The event included bouts that encompass the DREAM, Sengoku Raiden Championship, K-1, and K-1 World MAX banners. The event aired on HDNet in North America.

Results

See also 
 World Victory Road

References

World Victory Road events
2009 in mixed martial arts